Epimecia is a genus of moths of the family Noctuidae.

Species
 Epimecia ustula (Freyer, 1835)

References
Natural History Museum Lepidoptera genus database
Epimecia at funet 

Hadeninae